Lucius Titius Plautius Aquilinus was a Roman senator active during the middle of the second century AD.

Life
He was ordinary consul for 162 as the colleague of Junius Rusticus. Aquilinus is known only from inscriptions, which include brick stamps and the tombstone of one of his slaves.

Descended from an Italian family, Aquilinus may have been the brother of Plautius Quintillus, consul in 159, and therefore the son of Lucius Titius Epidius Aquilinus, consul in 125, and an Avidia Plautia. Details of Aquilinus' senatorial career have not yet been recovered.

References

Imperial Roman consuls
2nd-century Romans
Aquilinus
Plautius Aquilinus